Chief Bola Ahmed Adekunle Tinubu (born 29 March 1952) is a Nigerian accountant and politician who is the president-elect of Nigeria. He served as governor of Lagos State from 1999 to 2007 and senator for Lagos West during the brief Third Republic.

Tinubu spent his early life in southwestern Nigeria and later moved to the United States where he studied Accounting at Chicago State University. He returned to Nigeria in the early 1990s and was employed by Mobil Nigeria as an accountant, before entering politics as a Lagos West senatorial candidate in 1992 under the banner of the Social Democratic Party. After dictator Sani Abacha dissolved the Senate in 1993, Tinubu became an activist campaigning for the return of democracy as a part of the National Democratic Coalition movement. 

In the first post-transition Lagos State gubernatorial election, Tinubu won by a wide margin as a member of the Alliance for Democracy. Four years later, he won re-election to a second term. After leaving office in 2007, he played a key role in the formation of the All Progressives Congress in 2013. In 2023, he was elected president of Nigeria.

Early life and education
Tinubu is generally accepted in reliable sources to have been born in Nigeria in 1952; this year of birth is sometimes disputed by political opponents, who argue that he is much older. Some reliable sources note that his age has not been verfied. He completed undergraduate studies in the United States, first at Richard J. Daley College in Chicago and then at Chicago State University. He graduated in 1979 with a Bachelor of Science degree in Accounting.

Early career and drug dealing allegations 
Tinubu remained in the United States following graduation. In 1993, his assets were frozen by the US Government as a result of a court case asserting that the American government had "probable cause" to believe Tinubu's American bank accounts held the proceeds of heroin dealing. He settled with the government and forfeited about $460,000 later that year. Court documents and later reporting on the case suggested he worked in league with two Chicago heroin dealers. On his return to Nigeria in the early 1990s, he 
became an oil and gas company executive.

Early political career
Tinubu's political career began in 1991, when he joined the Social Democratic Party. In 1992, he was elected to the Senate, representing the Lagos West constituency in the short-lived Nigerian Third Republic.

After the results of the 12 June 1993 presidential elections were annulled, Tinubu became a founding member of the pro-democracy National Democratic Coalition, a group which mobilized support for the restoration of democracy and recognition of Moshood Abiola as winner of the 12 June election. Following the seizure of power as military head of state of General Sani Abacha, he went into exile in 1994 and returned to the country in 1998 after the death of the military dictator, which ushered in the transition to the Fourth Nigerian Republic.

In the run-up to the 1999 elections, Bola Tinubu was a protégé of Alliance for Democracy (AD) leaders Abraham Adesanya and Ayo Adebanjo. He went on to win the AD primaries for the Lagos State governorship elections in defeating Funsho Williams and Wahab Dosunmu, a former Minister of Works and Housing. In January 1999, he stood for the position of Governor of Lagos State on the AD ticket and was elected governor.

Governor of Lagos State
During his 8 years in government, Tinibu initiated new road construction, required to meet the needs of the fast-growing population of the state.

Tinubu, alongside a new deputy governor, Femi Pedro, won re-election into office as governor in April 2003. All other states in the South West fell to the People's Democratic Party in those elections. He was involved in a struggle with the Olusegun Obasanjo-controlled federal government over whether Lagos State had the right to create new Local Council Development Areas (LCDAs) to meet the needs of its large population. The controversy led to the federal government seizing funds meant for local councils in the state. During the latter part of his term in office, he was engaged in continuous clashes with PDP powers such as Adeseye Ogunlewe, a former Lagos State senator who had become minister of works, and Bode George, the southwest chairman of the PDP.

Relations between Tinubu and deputy governor Femi Pedro became increasingly tense after Pedro declared his intention to run for the gubernatorial elections. Pedro competed to become the AC candidate for governor in the 2007 elections, but withdrew his name on the eve of the party nomination. He defected to the Labour Party while still keeping his position as deputy governor. Tinubu's tenure as Lagos State Governor ended on 29 May 2007, when his successor Babatunde Fashola of the Action Congress took office.

Post-governorship
In 2006, Tinubu attempted to persuade the then-vice president of Nigeria Atiku Abubakar to become the head of his party, the Action Congress (AC). Abubakar who was a member of the People's Democratic Party (PDP), had recently fallen out with President Olusegun Obasanjo over Abubakar's ambition to succeed Obasanjo as president. Tinubu offered Abubakar the chance to switch parties and join the AC, offering him the his party's presidential candidacy, with the condition that he, Tinubu, would be Atiku Abubakar's running mate. Atiku declined the proposition and, having switched to the AC, chose a running mate from the South East, Senator Ben Obi. Although Atiku ran for office on Tinubu's platform in the election, the PDP still won, in a landslide.

In 2009, following the landslide victory of the People's Democratic Party (PDP) in the April 2007 elections, Tinubu became involved in negotiations to bring together the fragmented opposition parties into a "mega-party" capable of challenging the then ruling PDP. In February 2013, Tinubu was among several politicians who created a "mega opposition" party with the merger of Nigeria's three biggest opposition parties – the Action Congress of Nigeria (ACN), the Congress for Progressive Change (CPC), the All Nigeria Peoples Party (ANPP), a faction of the All Progressives Grand Alliance (APGA) and the new PDP (nPDP), a faction of the then ruling People's Democratic Party – into the All Progressives Congress (APC).

In 2014, Tinubu supported former military head of state General Muhammadu Buhari, leader of the CPC faction of the APC – who commanded widespread following in Northern Nigeria, and had previously contested in the 2003, 2007 and 2011 presidential elections as the CPC presidential candidate. Tinubu initially wanted to become Buhari's vice presidential candidate but later conceded for Yemi Osibanjo, his ally and former commissioner of justice. In 2015, Buhari rode the APC to victory, ending the 16-year rule of the PDP, and marking the first time an incumbent Nigerian president lost to an opposition candidate.

Tinubu went on to play an important role in the Buhari administration, supporting government policies and holding onto the internal party reins, in lieu of his long-held rumored presidential aspiration. In 2019, he supported Buhari's re-election campaign defeating the PDP candidate Atiku Abubakar. In 2020, following an internal party crisis which led to the removal of Tinubu ally and party chairman Adams Oshiomole, it is believed the move was to scuttle Tinubu's presidential prospects ahead of 2023.

President-elect of Nigeria

2023 presidential campaign
On 10 January 2022, Tinubu made his formal announcement of candidacy for president.

On 8 June 2022, Tinubu won the party convention vote of the ruling APC, scoring 1,271, to defeat Vice President Yemi Osinbajo and Rotimi Amaechi who scored 235 and 316 respectively.

On 1 March 2023, INEC declared Tinubu winner of the 2023 presidential election.
He was declared president-elect after he polled 8,794,726 votes to defeat his opponents. His runner-up Atiku Abubakar of the opposition People's Democratic Party (PDP) polled 6,984,520 votes. Labour Party's Peter Obi had 6,101,533 votes to come third.

Other activities

Alleged illegal operation of foreign accounts

In April 2007, after the general elections, but before the governor-elect Babatunde Fashola had taken office, the Federal Government brought Tinubu before the Code of Conduct Bureau for trial over the alleged illegal operation of 16 separate foreign accounts.

Allegations of corruption
In January 2009, the Economic and Financial Crimes Commission cleared Tinubu and governors James Ibori of Delta State and Obong Victor Attah of Akwa Ibom State of charges of conspiracy, money laundering, abuse of office and official corruption in relation to a sale of Vmobile network shares in 2004. In September 2009, there were reports that the British Metropolitan Police were investigating a transaction in which the Lagos State government made an investment in Econet (now Airtel). Tinubu said the transaction was straightforward and profitable to the state, with no intermediaries involved. The Federal Government rejected a request by Britain to release evidence needed for further investigation and prosecution of the three Nigerian ex-governors in a London court.

Potential plot to kill Tinubu

In March 2009, there were reports that a plot had been identified to kill Tinubu. The Alliance for Democracy called on the Inspector General of Police, Mike Okiro, to conduct a thorough investigation.

Political godfatherism and hooliganism in Lagos state
Tinubu has been widely perceived as the "Godfather of Lagos". His role in pulling the strings of the mega city-state was exposed in The Lion of Bourdillon, a 2015 documentary film highlighting Tinubu's political and financial grip on the city-state. Tinubu filed a ₦150 billion libel suit against the producers, Africa Independent Television (AIT). The documentary ceased airing on 6 March 2015. He has attempted to strongarm the political process, including in December 2009, when it was reported that Fashola and Tinubu had fallen out over the issue of Fashola's re-election as Governor of Lagos in 2011, with Tinubu preferring the commissioner for environment, Muiz Banire. A similar conflict took place in 2015 over Fashola's successor, Akinwunmi Ambode, pitting Fashola against Tinubu, who threw his full weight behind Ambode. Ambode succeeded Fashola, was ousted by Tinubu and replaced by incumbent Babajide Sanwo-Olu.

Bullion van controversy
During the 2019 election, a bullion van was seen entering Tinubu's residence on Bourdillion Road in Ikoyi, which he explained: "I keep money anywhere I want."

Personal life
Tinubu married Oluremi Tinubu, who is the current senator representing the Lagos Central senatorial district, in 1987. They have 3 children, Zainab Abisola Tinubu, Habibat Tinubu and Olayinka Tinubu. He fathered 3 children from previous relationships, Kazeem Olajide Tinubu (12 October 1974 – 31 October 2017), Folashade Tinubu (born 17 June 1976) and Oluwaseyi Tinubu (born 13 October 1985), whose mother is rumoured to be the former air hostess and prophetess Bunmi Oshonike.

Tinubu's mother, Abibatu Mogaji, died on 15 June 2013 at the age of 96. On 31 October 2017, his son, Jide Tinubu, died in London. Tinubu is a Muslim.Tinubu holds two chieftaincies; he is the "Asiwaju" of Lagos and the "Jagaban" of the Borgu Emirate in Niger State.

See also
 Timeline of Lagos, 2000s

References

1952 births
Living people
Yoruba politicians
Governors of Lagos State
Politicians from Lagos
Members of the Senate (Nigeria)
ExxonMobil people
Action Congress of Nigeria politicians
National Democratic Coalition (Nigeria) politicians
Alliance for Democracy (Nigeria) politicians
Chicago State University alumni
All Progressives Congress politicians
Bola
Nigerian expatriates in the United States
21st-century Nigerian politicians
Nigerian Muslims